Ceriporia inflata is a species of crust fungus in the family Irpicaceae. It was described as new to science in 2013 by mycologists Bi-Si Jia and Bao-Kai Cui. The fungus is distinguished macroscopically from other Ceriporia species by its relatively large pores, and microscopically by its hyphae, which swell in KOH. It is this latter feature for which the fungus is named. The type specimen of C. inflata was collected from Qiongzhong County (Hainan, China), where it was found growing on rotten angiosperm wood. It has also been recorded from Fenyi County in Jiangxi.

Description
Ceriporia inflata has crust-like fruit bodies that become corky or brittle when they are dry. The pore surface, initially white to cream, later becomes buff or darker in age. The pores are angular to irregular in outline, numbering 2–3 per millimetre. The fungus makes sausage-shaped to cylindrical spores that are smooth, thin-walled, hyaline, and measure 4.7–5.2 by 2–2.4 μm. C. inflata causes a white rot.

References

Fungi described in 2013
Fungi of China
Irpicaceae
Taxa named by Bao-Kai Cui